Tiffany Poon (born 29 December 1996, Hong Kong) is a Hong Kong-born American YouTuber and classical pianist, currently residing in New York City.

Career 
Poon began taking piano lessons at the age of 4. At 9, she moved to New York to study at the Juilliard School Pre-College Division for eight years with a full scholarship, under the guidance of Yoheved Kaplinsky. She also studied at The Calhoun School for high school, where she graduated in 2014. She continued her studies at the Columbia University / Juilliard School exchange program with Emanuel Ax and Joseph Kalichstein. In May 2018, she graduated from Columbia University as a John Jay Scholar with a Bachelor of Arts in Philosophy.

Poon made her concerto debut at the age of 10, and has appeared with orchestras and in recital throughout the United States, Canada, Europe, Australia and China. Among the venues where she has performed are Carnegie Hall, Steinway Hall in New York City, and Sala Mozart in Bologna, Italy. She has appeared as a soloist with the Plainfield Symphony Orchestra, Fort Smith Symphony Orchestra, ProMusica Chamber Orchestra, and Moscow Chamber Orchestra of Pavel Slobodkin Centre.

Poon has been active on social media since 2017.

In 2020, she founded Together with Classical, a nonprofit charity to unite people and communities by promoting classical music, and to support and fund classical music education programs and opportunities.

Awards 

 2012: First Prize and Best Performance of Concerto Award, 8th Moscow International Frederic Chopin Competition for Young Pianists
 2013: Kaufman Music Center International Youth Piano Competition
 2014: National YoungArts Winner in the United States
 2014: First Prize, Juilliard Pre-College Concerto Competition
 2014: Second Prize, 10th Chopin Golden Ring International Competition, Slovenia
 2015: Participant of the XVII International Chopin Piano Competition in Warsaw, Poland
 2016: First Prize, Manhattan International Music Competition
 2016: Third Prize, 17th International Robert Schumann Competition, Germany
 2016: Third Prize, “Debut at the Berlin Philharmonic Hall” International Concerto Competition
 2017: Second prize, Walter W. Naumburg Foundation International Competition
 2019: Second Place, KlavierOlymp of the Kissinger Sommer festival, Germany
 2019: Young Artist Award, Hessen Agency at the Rheingau Music Festival.

Discography 
 Natural Beauty - J.S. Bach, Haydn, Chopin, Liszt, Debussy, Kawai Edition, 2014
 The Dvorak Album - with Jan Vogler, Kevin Zhu, Chad Hoopes, Matthew Lipman and Juho Pohjonen, Sony Classical, 2022

References

External links 
Official website

1996 births
Living people
21st-century classical pianists
American classical musicians of Chinese descent
American classical pianists
American women pianists
Chinese classical pianists
Chinese women pianists
Juilliard School alumni
Columbia University alumni
21st-century American women
American YouTubers
Music YouTubers